Kenneth Hall (1913–1946) was a British painter who co-founded The White Stag group with Basil Rakoczi.

Life and work
Born in Farnham, Surrey and educated at Lancing College, he was designing furniture in London before he showed his work to the dealer Lucy Wertheim who offered to put him on at show at her gallery in Mayfair. Wertheim, along with Rakoczi, became the two greatest influences on his art and she recalls their meeting in her 1947 book 'Adventure in Art': "Kenneth Hall tentatively submitted a portfolio of work to me in 1934—he has exhibited in no gallery up till then—and I was so thrilled with his paintings and especially his watercolours that I promised him an exhibition...When his exhibition took place a few months later I was able to place examples of his work in the hands of a couple of well known collectors"

From 1935 to 1938 Hall and Rakozci travelled Europe and acquainted themselves with the various movements of the time including Surrealism. At the outbreak of World War II the pair moved to Ireland to try to avoid the conflict that was consuming Europe. They stopped first in Galway where they did much good work before heading to Dublin, where The White Stag group began to really take off. Hall organised the group's first exhibition held in April 1940, and it was received well, with praise from the Irish Times.

Despite the success of the exhibition and the growing depth and influence of the group in Dublin, as well as support from Wertheim in London, Hall was always racked by personal demons, and people found him hard to connect with. His personal relationship with Rakoczi it has been suggested was also part of the problem. According to Irish art critic Bruce Arnold, "No one understood anything about Kenneth Hall… He was depressive, he was gay, he had this love affair with Basil, who was bisexual and very active emotionally and sexually. Kenneth Hall couldn’t take that.”

In 1945 he returned to London and had an exhibition at Redfern Gallery, before moving to Wertheim's flat in Manchester. It was there that suffering with the depression that had long plagued him, he committed suicide on 26 July 1946.

Several of Hall's oil paintings are in UK public collections, including the National Museums Northern Ireland.

References

1913 births
1946 deaths
20th-century English painters
English male painters
People educated at Lancing College
Gay painters
English LGBT painters
English gay artists
1946 suicides
20th-century English LGBT people
Suicides in England
20th-century English male artists